The China Study: The Most Comprehensive Study of Nutrition Ever Conducted and the Startling Implications for Diet, Weight Loss and Long-term Health is a book by T. Colin Campbell and his son, Thomas M. Campbell II. The book argues for health benefits of a whole food plant-based diet. It was first published in the United States in January 2005 and had sold over one million copies as of October 2013, making it one of America's best-selling books about nutrition.

Synopsis 
The China Study examines the link between the consumption of animal products (including dairy) and chronic illnesses such as coronary heart disease, diabetes, breast cancer, prostate cancer, and bowel cancer. The book is "loosely based" on the China–Cornell–Oxford Project, a 20-year study which looked at mortality rates from cancer and other chronic diseases from 1973 to 1975 in 65 counties in China, and correlated this data with 1983–84 dietary surveys and blood work from 100 people in each county.

The authors conclude that people who eat a predominantly whole-food, vegan diet—avoiding animal products as a source of nutrition, including beef, pork, poultry, fish, eggs, cheese, and milk, and reducing their intake of processed foods and refined carbohydrates—will escape, reduce, or reverse the development of numerous diseases. They write that "eating foods that contain any cholesterol above 0 mg is unhealthy." The book recommends sunshine exposure or dietary supplements to maintain adequate levels of vitamin D, and supplements of vitamin B12 in case of complete avoidance of animal products. It criticizes low-carb diets, such as the Atkins diet, which include restrictions on the percentage of calories derived from carbohydrates. The authors are critical of reductionist approaches to the study of nutrition, whereby certain nutrients are blamed for disease, as opposed to studying patterns of nutrition and the interactions between nutrients.

Publication 
The book was first published in 2005. A revised and expanded edition was published in 2016. The book has also been published in German, Polish, Slovenian, Italian, Chinese, Japanese, Korean, Romanian, Swedish and Urdu.

Companion volumes

Reception
Sanjay Gupta, CNN's chief medical correspondent, said in his documentary The Last Heart Attack in 2011 that The China Study had changed the way people all over the world eat. Former American president Bill Clinton became a supporter when he adopted a plant-based diet after a heart attack.

Wilfred Niels Arnold, professor of biochemistry at the University of Kansas Medical Center, reviewed the book in Leonardo reviews in 2005: "[T]he authors anticipate resistant and hostile sources, sail on with escalating enthusiasm, and furnish a working hypothesis that is valuable. In fact, the surprising data are difficult to interpret in any other way."

Harriet Hall, writing for Science-Based Medicine, said that the book had references which do not support directly the claims made by the authors and that it did not explain the exceptions to his data, such as high rates of stomach cancer in China.

Stephan Guyenet reviewing the book for Red Pen Reviews commented that The China Study is a "scholarly and well-written book" but three of its key scientific claims are "not very well supported overall".

See also 
Calorie restriction
Forks Over Knives
Nurses' Health Study
Nutritionism
Vegan nutrition

References

Further reading

Nestle, Marion. Food Politics: How the Food Industry Influences Nutrition and Health. University of California Press, 2007. The author curates a personal blog about her book's themes at http://www.foodpolitics.com.

 Naked Food Magazine, quarterly magazine detailing a plant-based diet, with recipes. Website: NakedFoodMagazine.com

External links 
 
 
 The China Project Data and References
 Asians' switch to Western diet might bring Western-type diseases, new China-Taiwan study suggests
 Cancer and diet: What’s the connection?
 Protein

Books about food and drink
Health and wellness books
Health in China
Plant-based diets
Vegetarian-related mass media
Vegetarianism in the United States
BenBella Books books
2005 non-fiction books